Compsodrillia nakamurai is a species of sea snail, a marine gastropod mollusk in the family Pseudomelatomidae, the turrids and allies.

Description
The length of the shell attains 14.7 mm.

Distribution
This marine species occurs in the East China Sea and off Japan; fossils have been found in Miocene strata of Okinawa and Pliocene strata in Japan.

References

 Makiyama, J., 1931: Stratigraphy of the Kakegawa Pliocene in Totomi. Memoirs of the College of Science, Kyoto Imperial University, vol.7, no.1, pp. 1–53, pls.1-3

External links
  F. Stearns MacNeil, Tertiary and Quaternary Gastropoda of Okinawa, Geological Survey Professional Paper, United States Government Printing Office, Washington 1960
 Femorale: Compsodrilia nakamurai

nakamurai
Gastropods described in 1971